Edna's Goldfish was an American ska punk band from Long Island, New York.

Together from 1997 to 2000, their studio albums include Before You Knew Better (1998) and The Elements of Transition (1999), both released on Moon Ska Records. The video for their song "Veronica Sawyer" received some airplay on the MTV show 120 Minutes. The band toured with bands such as The Toasters, Catch 22, Mustard Plug, Reel Big Fish, and Less Than Jake.

After their 2000 tour with Rx Bandits and The Gadjits, the band decided to split in order to pursue other interests.  Singer Brian Diaz went on to form The Reunion Show with ex-members of Step Lively and The Lightweights.  Trombonist Ian McKenzie continued to play with Catch 22. Bass player Kris Baldwin played as a studio musician for Epic Records and also recorded and played with Action Action. As of 2019, Kris Baldwin works for Warner Bros. as an animation technical director. In the beginning of April 2005, the members of Edna's Goldfish reunited to play a cancer benefit concert at the Crazy Donkey, in Farmingdale, New York, for a friend of the band who had cancer.

In 2009, Edna's Goldfish played their first show in four years on May 2 at the Bamboozle Festival in East Rutherford, New Jersey at the Meadowlands Sports Complex.

In November 2011, Connecticut's Asbestos Records and Chicago's Underground Communiqué Records launched a fundraiser together on Kickstarter to release "Before You Knew Better" on vinyl, among other third-wave ska classics from Pilfers, The Pietasters, and Suburban Legends. If the funding goal is met by January 18, 2012, the records were due to be released later that year. The track "Better Days" is included as a bonus track on this release.

Edna's Goldfish performed to a capacity crowd on October 21, 2012, at Gramercy Theatre in New York City.

Members
Brian Diaz - vocals
David A. Galea - trumpet
Gary Henderson - trumpet
Vincent McAuliffe - guitar
Michael Warner - drums, vocals
Tom Comerford - trombone
Kristopher Baldwin - bass

Other members
David Ringel - bass (1997–1999)
Dave Sacrastano - bass (1997)
Jon Middleman - bass (2 songs on "Before You Knew Better")
Dave Waldo - keyboards ("Veronica Sawyer" off of "Elements of Transition")
Matt Holmgren - trombone
Ian McKenzie - trombone(replaced Tom Comerford, who was originally in the band, before leaving for Catch22)
Dave Soloman - Trombone for the reunion/benefit show

References

American ska musical groups
Third-wave ska groups
Musical groups from Long Island